Karmika Kallanalla is a 1982 Indian Kannada film, directed by K. S. R. Das and produced by A. L. Abbaiah Naidu. The film stars Vishnuvardhan, Aarathi, Shankar Nag and Dwarakish in lead roles. The film has musical score by G. K. Venkatesh.

Cast
Vishnuvardhan
Aarathi
Shankar Nag
Swapna
Dwarakish
Vajramuni
Manu
Tiger Prabhakar in Guest Appearance
A. L. Abbainaidu in Guest Appearance
Jyothilakshmi
Baby Shanthi
Chethan Ramarao
Hanumanthachar
Negro Johnny

References

External links
 
 

1982 films
1980s Kannada-language films
Films directed by K. S. R. Das
Films scored by G. K. Venkatesh